Alexandre Ivanovich Dubuque, also Alexander and Dubuc (Aleksandr Ivanovich Diubiuk;   – ), was a 19th-century Russian pianist, composer and teacher of French descent.

He was born and died in Moscow. His father was a refugee from the French Revolution who had fled to Russia. He studied piano under the tutelage of John Field. 

One of his works was "Ne brani menya rodnaya" (possible translation: Do not scold me, my darling), which was played by Léon Theremin around the 1950s and later by Kaia Galina Urb with Heiki Mätlik.

Students 

 Mily Balakirev 
 Nikolai Zverev

References

External links

1812 births
1898 deaths
19th-century classical composers
Male classical pianists
Musicians from Moscow
Russian classical pianists
Russian male classical composers
Russian Romantic composers